Nazlı Tolga (born 8 November 1979) is a Turkish-Dutch journalist and television host. Tolga was the anchorwoman of the leading local and foreign affairs programme FOX Ana Haber and Nazlı Tolga ile Haber Masası.

Nazlı Tolga was born  in Ankara, Turkey. She was born into a Muslim-Turkish Family from Samsun and Malatya in Ankara. She is fluent in Turkish, Dutch, Brazilian Portuguese, and English. After completing her elementary and high school education in American College of Istanbul, she attended Marmara University, Faculty of Communication–the leading institution of communication education and studies in Turkey. She studied at the Department of Journalism. Tolga started her journalism career at Kanal D Haber in 1998. She worked in Show TV, Skyturk, and Fox. She married Dutch businessman Lawrence Brenninkmeyer at the Cathedral of the Holy Spirit in Istanbul in September 2013. She lives in Brazil, London, and Shanghai. She is a Roman Catholic since 2013. In the past years, Tolga became the mother of two baby girls.

TV programmes
 Kanal D Gece Haberleri (Kanal D, 1998–2002)
 Nazlı Tolga ile Haber Masası (Skyturk, 2004 – September 2007)
 Show Haber (2002–2003)
 FOX ON Ana Haber (2008–2010)
 Nazlı Tolga ile Fox Ana Haber (3 September 2007 – 14 June 2013)

References 

1979 births
People from Ankara
Journalists from Istanbul
Turkish television journalists
Dutch journalists
Dutch people of Turkish descent
Marmara University alumni
Living people
Women television journalists
Converts to Roman Catholicism from Islam
Turkish Roman Catholics
Turkish former Muslims